Choi Ji-hee (born 10 February 1995) is a professional South Korean tennis player.

Choi has won one doubles title on the WTA Tour, one doubles title on the WTA Challenger Tour as well as three singles and 19 doubles titles on tournaments of the ITF Circuit.

Playing for South Korea Fed Cup team, Choi has a win–loss record of 3–3.

WTA career finals

Doubles: 1 (title)

WTA 125 tournament finals

Doubles: 1 (title)

ITF Circuit finals

Singles: 9 (3 titles, 6 runner–ups)

Doubles: 31 (21 titles, 10 runner–ups)

Notes

External links
 
 
 

1995 births
Living people
South Korean female tennis players
Tennis players from Seoul
Tennis players at the 2014 Asian Games
Tennis players at the 2018 Asian Games
Asian Games competitors for South Korea
21st-century South Korean women